Rouen is the historical capital city of Normandy, France.

Rouen may also refer to:

Family name
 Charles Rouen (born 1838), Belgian military historian
 Tom Rouen (born 1968), American football punter

Other
 Rouen Mountains, Antarctica
 Rouen Duck, a heavyweight breed of domesticated duck